Keith David Mills (born 29 December 1942) is an English former professional footballer who played in the Football League as a right half.

References

Sources
Wimbledon stats at AFCW

1942 births
Living people
People from Egham
English footballers
Association football midfielders
Grimsby Town F.C. players
Wimbledon F.C. players
Hillingdon Borough F.C. players
English Football League players